

Jupiter Entertainment (also known as Jupiter) is an American television production company founded by Stephen Land in 1996.

The company has offices in New York, Los Angeles, and Knoxville, Tennessee.

In March 2015, Sky plc acquired 60% of Jupiter.

Current television shows
 American Detective with Lt. Joe Kenda
 In Pursuit with John Walsh
 Vengeance: Killer Lovers
 Vengeance: Killer Neighbors
 Vengeance: Killer Coworkers
 Vengeance: Killer Millionaires
 Vengeance: Killer Families
 Vengeance: Killer Newlyweds
 Fatal Attraction
 Snapped
 Snapped: Killer Couples
 Welcome to Myrtle Manor
 Storm of Suspicion

Past television shows

 Sons of Guns
 Sins and Secrets 
 Modern Marvels 
 City Confidential 
 Biography
 The Diamond Story
 Three Precious Gems: Rubies, Emeralds, Sapphires
 Human Weapon 
 HowStuffWorks
 America's Castles 
 RollerJam 
 Club Dance
 Ten Exotic and Phenomenal Gemstones
 Hey Dude 
 Dominick Dunne's Power, Privilege, and Justice
 King of the Jungle 
 The Grand Tour
 The Gemstone Journey
 Live Through This 
 Homicide Hunter: Lt. Joe Kenda

References

External links
 
 Home Grown/WBIR Interview with Stephen Land

Companies based in Knoxville, Tennessee
Television production companies of the United States
Mass media companies established in 1996